Ben Rufus Green is an actor and comedian from Canterbury, Kent, England, known for playing David in The Cockfields, and his own sketch comedy videos. His work can be seen on YOBI.tv, Funny or Die, YouTube, and MySpace. His alias on these websites is greensville.

Green has been writing and acting in sketches since 2006. He has also appeared in a number of television programmes including regular or recurring roles on EastEnders, Small World and Deaf Funny.

Early life
Green received his Bachelor of Arts in Theatre Media Drama in 1998 with Honours from the University of Glamorgan (now the University of South Wales). He served in the British Territorial Army for one year.

Career
In 2009, Green won the YOBI Laugh contest from YOBI.tv's first season for his entry "Punch Me I Won't Sue". He won $10,000 USD and tickets for two to the premiere of The Informant! starring Matt Damon as well as access to an after party and VIP tickets to the taping of the Late Show with David Letterman. Green is the co-star with Michael Sorrentino (of the Jersey Shore series) of the YOBI.tv New Stage webseries.

In early 2019 Green appeared in 2 episodes of EastEnders as Rory, the facilitator at a Narcotics Anonymous meeting attended by Rainie Branning (Tanya Franks) and Stuart Highway (Ricky Champ). Later that year here appeared in an episode of GameFace as a dog walker who becomes involved in an awkward exchange with Marcella (played by Roisin Conaty) on a park bench. In November of that year he also appeared as series regular David, son of Bobby Ball's character Ray and step-brother to Joe Wilkinson's character Simon, in sitcom The Cockfields.

In December 2019, Green's short Paper Trail, which he wrote and starred in, was nominated for a Writers' Guild Award in the Best Comedy Short category. It had previously been a Comedy Shorts Awards finalist in the 2019 Funny Women Awards for director Emily Brown.

Filmography

References

External links
 
 Ben's Website
 Ben's MySpace
 Ben's YouTube Channel
 Ben's Funny or Die Profile
 Ben's Facebook

Categories

1973 births
Living people
English male comedians
People from Canterbury
Alumni of the University of Glamorgan